USS Anemone IV (SP-1290) was a United States Navy patrol vessel in service from 1917 to 1919.

Anemone IV was built as a private ketch-rigged motor schooner of the same name in 1899 by Camper & Nicholson at Gosport, Maine. On 3 October 1917, the U.S. Navy acquired her at Port Townsend, Washington, under a free lease from her owner, E. A. Sims, for use as a section patrol boat during World War I. She apparently was never commissioned, but she saw active non-commissioned service as USS Anemone IV (SP-1290).

Assigned to the 13th Naval District, Anemone IV was employed to train recruits at Naval Training Station Seattle at Seattle, Washington, for over a year. At some point she was renamed USS SP-1290.

The Navy placed SP-1290 out of service on 3 March 1919. She was stricken from the Navy List and simultaneously returned to Sims on 4 March 1919.

References

Department of the Navy Naval History and Heritage Command Online Library of Selected Images: Civilian Ships: Anemone IV (American Motor Ketch, 1899). Had Naval service as Anemone IV (SP-1290) and SP-1290 in 1917–1919
NavSource Online: Section Patrol Craft Photo Archive Anemone IV (SP 1290)

Schooners of the United States Navy
Ketches of the United States Navy
Patrol vessels of the United States Navy
World War I patrol vessels of the United States
Ships built in Maine
1899 ships